Noviherbaspirillum autotrophicum is a Gram-negative and rod-shaped bacterium from the genus of Noviherbaspirillum which has been isolated from rice paddy soil.

References

External links
Type strain of Noviherbaspirillum autotrophicum at BacDive -  the Bacterial Diversity Metadatabase

Burkholderiales
Bacteria described in 2017